Christoph Bertschy (born 5 April 1994) is a Swiss professional ice hockey center currently playing for HC Fribourg-Gottéron of the National League (NL). He was drafted 158th overall by the Minnesota Wild in the 2012 NHL Entry Draft.

Playing career
Bertschy previously played professionally with SC Bern of Switzerland's National League A. On 26 April 2015, Bertschy was signed to a three-year entry-level contract with the Minnesota Wild.

With his development stalling within the Wild organization, on 8 February 2018, he was traded alongside Mario Lucia to the New Jersey Devils in exchange for Viktor Lööv. He was immediately reassigned to continue with the Binghamton Devils of the AHL.

On 27 April 2018, as a pending restricted free agent with the Devils and unable to cement a role in the NHL, Bertschy opted to return to Switzerland by signing a four-year contract with Lausanne HC of the National League.

Career statistics

Regular season and playoffs

International

References

External links
 

1994 births
Living people
Binghamton Devils players
HC Fribourg-Gottéron players
Iowa Wild players
Lausanne HC players
Minnesota Wild draft picks
Minnesota Wild players
Sportspeople from the canton of Fribourg
SC Bern players
Swiss ice hockey centres
Ice hockey players at the 2022 Winter Olympics
Olympic ice hockey players of Switzerland